Sebastián Lerdo de Tejada was president of Mexico from 1872 to 1876.

Lerdo de Tejada may also refer to:
People
Miguel Lerdo de Tejada (1812–1861), Mexican politician, elder brother of the above
Miguel Lerdo de Tejada (composer) (1869–1941)
Places named for Sebastián Lerdo de Tejada
Lerdo de Tejada, Veracruz, a city and municipality
Lerdo de Tejada metro station, on the Monterrey Metro